Elie Wiesel (born Eliezer Wiesel,  Eliezer Vizel; September 30, 1928 – July 2, 2016) was a Romanian-born American writer, professor, political activist, Nobel laureate, and Holocaust survivor. He authored 57 books, written mostly in French and English, including Night, a work based on his experiences as a Jewish prisoner in the Auschwitz and Buchenwald concentration camps.

He was a professor of the humanities at Boston University, which created the Elie Wiesel Center for Jewish Studies in his honor. He was involved with Jewish causes and human rights causes and helped establish the United States Holocaust Memorial Museum in Washington, D.C. In his political activities, he also campaigned for victims of oppression in places like South Africa, Nicaragua, Kosovo, and Sudan. He publicly condemned the 1915 Armenian genocide and remained a strong defender of human rights during his lifetime. He was described as "the most important Jew in America" by the Los Angeles Times in 2003.

Wiesel was awarded the Nobel Peace Prize in 1986. The Norwegian Nobel Committee called him a "messenger to mankind", stating that through his struggle to come to terms with "his own personal experience of total humiliation and of the utter contempt for humanity shown in Hitler's death camps", as well as his "practical work in the cause of peace", Wiesel delivered a message "of peace, atonement, and human dignity" to humanity. The Nobel Committee also stressed that Wiesel's commitment originated in the sufferings of the Jewish people but that he expanded it to embrace all repressed peoples and races. He was a founding board member of the New York Human Rights Foundation and remained active in it throughout his life.

Early life

Elie Wiesel was born in Sighet (now Sighetu Marmației), Maramureș, in the Carpathian Mountains of Romania. His parents were Sarah Feig and Shlomo Wiesel. At home, Wiesel's family spoke Yiddish most of the time, but also German, Hungarian, and Romanian. Wiesel's mother, Sarah, was the daughter of Dodye Feig, a Vizhnitz Hasid and farmer from the nearby village of Bocskó. Dodye was active and trusted within the community.

Wiesel's father, Shlomo, instilled a strong sense of humanism in his son, encouraging him to learn Hebrew and to read literature, whereas his mother encouraged him to study the Torah. Wiesel has said his father represented reason, while his mother Sarah promoted faith. Wiesel was instructed that his genealogy traced back to Rabbi Schlomo Yitzhaki (Rashi), and was a descendant of Rabbi Yeshayahu ben Abraham Horovitz ha-Levi.

Wiesel had three siblings—older sisters Beatrice and Hilda, and younger sister Tzipora. Beatrice and Hilda survived the war, and were reunited with Wiesel at a French orphanage. They eventually emigrated to North America, with Beatrice moving to Montreal, Quebec, Canada. Tzipora, Shlomo, and Sarah did not survive the Holocaust.

Imprisonment and orphaning during the Holocaust

In March 1944, Germany occupied Hungary, thus extending the Holocaust into Northern Transylvania as well. Wiesel was 15, and he, with his family, along with the rest of the town's Jewish population, was placed in one of the two confinement ghettos set up in Máramarossziget (Sighet), the town where he had been born and raised. In May 1944, the Hungarian authorities, under German pressure, began to deport the Jewish community to the Auschwitz concentration camp, where up to 90 percent of the people were killed on arrival.

Immediately after they were sent to Auschwitz, his mother and his younger sister were murdered. Wiesel and his father were selected to perform labor so long as they remained able-bodied, after which they were to be killed in the gas chambers. Wiesel and his father were later deported to the concentration camp at Buchenwald. Until that transfer, he admitted to Oprah Winfrey, his primary motivation for trying to survive Auschwitz was knowing that his father was still alive: "I knew that if I died, he would die." After they were taken to Buchenwald, his father died before the camp was liberated. In Night, Wiesel recalled the shame he felt when he heard his father being beaten and was unable to help.

Wiesel was tattooed with inmate number "A-7713" on his left arm. The camp was liberated by the U.S. Third Army on April 11, 1945, when they were just prepared to be evacuated from Buchenwald.

Post-war career as a writer

France
After World War II ended and Wiesel was freed, he joined a transport of 1,000 child survivors of Buchenwald to Ecouis, France, where the Œuvre de secours aux enfants (OSE) had established a rehabilitation center. Wiesel joined a smaller group of 90 to 100 boys from Orthodox homes who wanted kosher facilities and a higher level of religious observance; they were cared for in a home in Ambloy under the directorship of Judith Hemmendinger. This home was later moved to Taverny and operated until 1947.

Afterwards, Wiesel traveled to Paris where he learned French and studied literature, philosophy and psychology at the Sorbonne. He heard lectures by philosopher Martin Buber and existentialist Jean-Paul Sartre and he spent his evenings reading works by Fyodor Dostoyevsky, Franz Kafka, and Thomas Mann.

By the time he was 19, he had begun working as a journalist, writing in French, while also teaching Hebrew and working as a choirmaster. He wrote for Israeli and French newspapers, including Tsien in Kamf (in Yiddish).

In 1946, after learning of the Irgun's bombing of the King David Hotel in Jerusalem, Wiesel made an unsuccessful attempt to join the underground Zionist movement. In 1948, he translated articles from Hebrew into Yiddish for Irgun periodicals, but never became a member of the organization. In 1949, he traveled to Israel as a correspondent for the French newspaper L'arche. He then was hired as Paris correspondent for the Israeli newspaper Yedioth Ahronoth, subsequently becoming its roaming international correspondent.

For ten years after the war, Wiesel refused to write about or discuss his experiences during the Holocaust. He began to reconsider his decision after a meeting with the French author François Mauriac, the 1952 Nobel Laureate in Literature who eventually became Wiesel's close friend. Mauriac was a devout Christian who had fought in the French Resistance during the war. He compared Wiesel to "Lazarus rising from the dead", and saw from Wiesel's tormented eyes, "the death of God in the soul of a child". Mauriac persuaded him to begin writing about his harrowing experiences.

Wiesel first wrote the 900-page memoir Un di velt hot geshvign (And the World Remained Silent) in Yiddish, which was published in abridged form in Buenos Aires. Wiesel rewrote a shortened version of the manuscript in French, La Nuit, in 1955. It was translated into English as Night in 1960. The book sold few copies after its initial publication, but still attracted interest from reviewers, leading to television interviews with Wiesel and meetings with writers such as Saul Bellow.

As its profile rose, Night was eventually translated into 30 languages with ten million copies sold in the United States. At one point film director Orson Welles wanted to make it into a feature film, but Wiesel refused, feeling that his memoir would lose its meaning if it were told without the silences in between his words. Oprah Winfrey made it a spotlight selection for her book club in 2006.

United States
In 1955, Wiesel moved to New York as foreign correspondent for the Israel daily, Yediot Ahronot. In 1969, he married Austrian Marion Erster Rose, who also translated many of his books. They had one son, Shlomo Elisha Wiesel, named after Wiesel's father.

In the U.S., he eventually wrote over 40 books, most of them non-fiction Holocaust literature, and novels. As an author, he was awarded a number of literary prizes and is considered among the most important in describing the Holocaust from a highly personal perspective. As a result, some historians credited Wiesel with giving the term Holocaust its present meaning, although he did not feel that the word adequately described that historical event. In 1975, he co-founded the magazine Moment with writer Leonard Fein.

The 1979 book and play The Trial of God are said to have been based on his real-life Auschwitz experience of witnessing three Jews who, close to death, conduct a trial against God, under the accusation that He has been oppressive towards the Jewish people.

Wiesel also played a role in the initial success of The Painted Bird by Jerzy Kosinski by endorsing it before it became known the book was fiction and, in the sense that it was presented as all Kosinski's true experience, a hoax.

Wiesel published two volumes of memoirs. The first, All Rivers Run to the Sea, was published in 1994 and covered his life up to the year 1969. The second, titled And the Sea is Never Full and published in 1999, covered the years from 1969 to 1999.

Political activism

Wiesel and his wife, Marion, started the Elie Wiesel Foundation for Humanity in 1986. He served as chairman of the President's Commission on the Holocaust (later renamed the US Holocaust Memorial Council) from 1978 to 1986, spearheading the building of the United States Holocaust Memorial Museum in Washington, D.C. Sigmund Strochlitz was his close friend and confidant during these years.

The Holocaust Memorial Museum gives the Elie Wiesel Award to "internationally prominent individuals whose actions have advanced the Museum's vision of a world where people confront hatred, prevent genocide, and promote human dignity". The Foundation had invested its endowment in money manager Bernard L. Madoff's investment Ponzi scheme, costing the Foundation $15 million and Wiesel and his wife much of their own personal savings.

Support for Israeli government policy
In 1982, at the request of the Israeli Foreign Ministry, Wiesel agreed to resign from his position as chairman of a planned international conference on the Holocaust and the Armenian genocide. Wiesel then worked with the Foreign Ministry in its attempts to get the conference either cancelled or to remove all discussion of the Armenian genocide from it, and to those ends he provided the Foreign Ministry with internal documents on the conference's planning and lobbied fellow academics to not attend the conference.

Following his death, Wiesel was criticised by some for his perceived silence on certain Israeli government policies with regards to the Palestinians. During his lifetime Weisel had deflected questions on the topic, claiming to abstain from commenting on Israel's 'internal debates'. Despite this position, Wiesel had gone on record as supporting the idea of expanding Jewish settlements into the Palestinian territories conquered by Israel during the 6 Day War, such settlements are considered illegal by the international community.

Awards
Wiesel was awarded the Nobel Peace Prize in 1986 for speaking out against violence, repression, and racism. The Norwegian Nobel Committee described Wiesel as "one of the most important spiritual leaders and guides in an age when violence, repression, and racism continue to characterize the world". Wiesel explained his feelings during his acceptance speech:

He received many other prizes and honors for his work, including the Congressional Gold Medal in 1985, the Presidential Medal of Freedom, and The International Center in New York's Award of Excellence. 
He was also elected to the American Academy of Arts and Letters in 1996.

Wiesel co-founded Moment magazine with Leonard Fein in 1975. They founded the magazine to provide a voice for American Jews. He was also a member of the International Advisory Board of NGO Monitor.

Wiesel became a regular speaker on the subject of the Holocaust. As a political activist, he advocated for many causes, including Israel, the plight of Soviet and Ethiopian Jews, the victims of apartheid in South Africa, Argentina's Desaparecidos, Bosnian victims of genocide in the former Yugoslavia, Nicaragua's Miskito Indians, and the Kurds.

In April 1999, Wiesel delivered the speech "The Perils of Indifference" in Washington D.C., criticizing the people and countries who chose to be indifferent while the Holocaust was happening. He defined indifference as being neutral between two sides, which, in this case, amounts to overlooking the victims of the Holocaust. Throughout the speech, he expressed the view that a little bit of attention, either positive or negative, is better than no attention at all.

In 2003, he discovered and publicized the fact that at least 280,000 Romanian and Ukrainian Jews, along with other groups, were massacred in Romanian-run death camps.

In 2005, he gave a speech at the opening ceremony of the new building of Yad Vashem, the Israeli Holocaust History Museum:
I know what people say – it is so easy. Those that were there won't agree with that statement. The statement is: it was man's inhumanity to man. NO! It was man's inhumanity to Jews! Jews were not killed because they were human beings. In the eyes of the killers they were not human beings! They were Jews!

In early 2006, Wiesel accompanied Oprah Winfrey as she visited Auschwitz, a visit which was broadcast as part of The Oprah Winfrey Show. On November 30, 2006, Wiesel received a knighthood in London in recognition of his work toward raising Holocaust education in the United Kingdom.

In September 2006, he appeared before the UN Security Council with actor George Clooney to call attention to the humanitarian crisis in Darfur. When Wiesel died, Clooney wrote, "We had a champion who carried our pain, our guilt, and our responsibility on his shoulders for generations."

In 2007, Wiesel was awarded the Dayton Literary Peace Prize's Lifetime Achievement Award. That same year, the Elie Wiesel Foundation for Humanity issued a letter condemning Armenian genocide denial, a letter that was signed by 53 Nobel laureates including Wiesel. Wiesel has repeatedly called Turkey's 90-year-old campaign to downplay its actions during the Armenian genocide a double killing.

In 2009, Wiesel criticized the Vatican for lifting the excommunication of controversial bishop Richard Williamson, a member of the Society of Saint Pius X. The excommunication was later reimposed.

In June 2009, Wiesel accompanied US President Barack Obama and German Chancellor Angela Merkel as they toured the Buchenwald concentration camp. Wiesel was an adviser at the Gatestone Institute. In 2010, Wiesel accepted a five-year appointment as a Distinguished Presidential Fellow at Chapman University in Orange County, California. In that role, he made a one-week visit to Chapman annually to meet with students and offer his perspective on subjects ranging from Holocaust history to religion, languages, literature, law and music.

In July 2009, Wiesel announced his support to the minority Tamils in Sri Lanka. He said that, "Wherever minorities are being persecuted, we must raise our voices to protest ... The Tamil people are being disenfranchised and victimized by the Sri Lanka authorities. This injustice must stop. The Tamil people must be allowed to live in peace and flourish in their homeland."

In 2009, Wiesel returned to Hungary for his first visit since the Holocaust. During this visit, Wiesel participated in a conference at the Upper House Chamber of the Hungarian Parliament, met Prime Minister Gordon Bajnai and President László Sólyom, and made a speech to the approximately 10,000 participants of an anti-racist gathering held in Faith Hall. However, in 2012, he protested against "the whitewashing" of Hungary's involvement in the Holocaust, and he gave up the Great Cross award he had received from the Hungarian government.

Wiesel was active in trying to prevent Iran from making nuclear weapons, stating that, "The words and actions of the leadership of Iran leave no doubt as to their intentions". He also condemned Hamas for the "use of children as human shields" during the 2014 Israel-Gaza conflict by running an ad in several large newspapers. The Times refused to run the advertisement, saying, "The opinion being expressed is too strong, and too forcefully made, and will cause concern amongst a significant number of Times readers."

Wiesel often emphasized the Jewish connection to Jerusalem, and criticized the Obama administration for pressuring Israeli Prime Minister Benjamin Netanyahu to halt East Jerusalem Israeli settlement construction. He stated that "Jerusalem is above politics. It is mentioned more than six hundred times in Scripture—and not a single time in the Koran ... It belongs to the Jewish people and is much more than a city".

Teaching
Wiesel held the position of Andrew Mellon Professor of the Humanities at Boston University from 1976, teaching in both its religion and philosophy departments. He became a close friend of the president and chancellor John Silber. The university created the Elie Wiesel Center for Jewish Studies in his honor. From 1972 to 1976 Wiesel was a Distinguished Professor at the City University of New York and member of the American Federation of Teachers.

In 1982 he served as the first Henry Luce Visiting Scholar in Humanities and Social Thought at Yale University. He also co-instructed Winter Term (January) courses at Eckerd College, St. Petersburg, Florida. From 1997 to 1999 he was Ingeborg Rennert Visiting Professor of Judaic Studies at Barnard College of Columbia University.

Personal life

In 1969 he married Marion Erster Rose, who originally was from Austria and also translated many of his books. They had one son, Shlomo Elisha Wiesel, named after Wiesel's father. The family lived in Greenwich, Connecticut.

Wiesel was attacked in a San Francisco hotel by 22-year-old Holocaust denier Eric Hunt in February 2007, but was not injured. Hunt was arrested the following month and charged with multiple offenses.

In May 2011, Wiesel served as the Washington University in St. Louis commencement speaker. 

In February 2012, a member of the Church of Jesus Christ of Latter-day Saints performed a posthumous baptism for Simon Wiesenthal's parents without proper authorization. After his own name was submitted for proxy baptism, Wiesel spoke out against the unauthorized practice of posthumously baptizing Jews and asked presidential candidate and Latter-day Saint Mitt Romney to denounce it. Romney's campaign declined to comment, directing such questions to church officials.

Death and aftermath
Wiesel died on the morning of July 2, 2016, at his home in Manhattan, aged 87. After a private funeral service was conducted in honor of him at the Fifth Avenue Synagogue, he was buried at the Sharon Gardens Cemetery in Valhalla, New York, on July 3.

Utah senator Orrin Hatch paid tribute to Wiesel in a speech on the Senate floor the following week, in which he said that "With Elie's passing, we have lost a beacon of humanity and hope. We have lost a hero of human rights and a luminary of Holocaust literature."

In 2018, antisemitic graffiti was found on the house where Wiesel was born.

Awards and honors
 Prix de l'Université de la Langue Française (Prix Rivarol) for The Town Beyond the Wall, 1963.
National Jewish Book Award for The Town Beyond the Wall, 1965.
 Ingram Merrill award, 1964.
 Prix Médicis for A Beggar in Jerusalem, 1968.
National Jewish Book Award for Souls on Fire: Portraits and Legends of Hasidic Masters, 1973.
 Jewish Heritage Award, Haifa University, 1975.
 Holocaust Memorial Award, New York Society of Clinical Psychologists, 1975.
 S.Y. Agnon Medal, 1980.
 Jabotinsky Medal, State of Israel, 1980.
 Prix Livre Inter, France, for The Testament, 1980.
 Grand Prize in Literature from the City of Paris for The Fifth Son, 1983.
 Commander in the French Legion of Honor, 1984.
 U.S. Congressional Gold Medal, 1984.
 Four Freedom Award for the Freedom of Worship, 1985.
 Medal of Liberty, 1986.
 Nobel Peace Prize, 1986.
 Grand Officer in the French Legion of Honor, 1990.
 Presidential Medal of Freedom, 1992
 Niebuhr Medal, Elmhurst College, Illinois, 1995.
 Golden Plate Award of the American Academy of Achievement, 1996, presented by Awards Council member Rosa Parks at the Academy's 35th annual Summit in Sun Valley, Idaho.
 Grand Cross in the French Legion of Honor, 2000.
 Order of the Star of Romania, 2002.
 Man of the Year award, Tel Aviv Museum of Art, 2005.
 Light of Truth award, International Campaign for Tibet, 2005.
 Honorary Knighthood, United Kingdom, 2006.
 Honorary Visiting Professor of Humanities, Rochester College, 2008.
 National Humanities Medal, 2009.
 Norman Mailer Prize, Lifetime Achievement, 2011.
 Loebenberg Humanitarian Award, Florida Holocaust Museum, 2012.
 Kenyon Review Award for Literary Achievement, 2012
 Nadav Award, 2012.
 S. Roger Horchow Award for Greatest Public Service by a Private Citizen, an award given out annually by Jefferson Awards, 2013.
 John Jay Medal for Justice John Jay College, 2014.
 Bust of Wiesel was carved on the Human Rights Porch of the Washington National Cathedral in Washington, D.C., 2021.

Honorary degrees
Wiesel had received more than 90 honorary degrees from colleges worldwide.
 Doctor of Humane Letters, Lehigh University, Bethlehem, Pennsylvania, 1985.
 Doctor of Humane Letters, DePaul University, Chicago, Illinois, 1997.
 Doctorate, Seton Hall University, New Jersey, 1998.
 Doctor of Humanities, Michigan State University, 1999.
 Doctorate, McDaniel College, Westminster, Maryland, 2005.
 Doctor of Humane Letters, Chapman University, 2005.
 Doctor of Humane Letters, Dartmouth College, 2006.
 Doctor of Humane Letters, Cabrini College, Radnor, Pennsylvania, 2007.
 Doctor of Humane Letters, University of Vermont, 2007.
 Doctor of Humanities, Oakland University, Rochester, Michigan, 2007.
 Doctor of Letters, City College of New York, 2008.
 Doctorate, Tel Aviv University, 2008.
 Doctorate, Weizmann Institute, Rehovot, Israel, 2008.
 Doctor of Humane Letters, Bucknell University, Lewisburg, Pennsylvania, 2009.
 Doctor of Letters, Lehigh University, Bethlehem, Pennsylvania, 2010.
 Doctor of Humane Letters, Washington University in St. Louis, 2011.
 Doctor of Humane Letters, College of Charleston, 2011.
 Doctorate, University of Warsaw, June 25, 2012.
 Doctorate, The University of British Columbia, September 10, 2012.
Doctorate, Pontifical University of John Paul II, June 30, 2015

See also
 The Boys of Buchenwald – documentary about the orphanage in which he stayed after the Holocaust
 Canadian Institute for the Study of Antisemitism
 Elie Wiesel bibliography
 Elie Wiesel National Institute for Studying the Holocaust in Romania
 Genesis Prize
 God on Trial – a 2008 joint BBC / WGBH Boston dramatization of his book The Trial of God
 Holocaust research
 List of civil rights leaders
 List of investors in Bernard L. Madoff Securities
 List of Jewish Nobel laureates

References
Informational notes

Citations

Speeches and interviews

 Elie Wiesel Video Gallery
 
 
 
 "Perils of Indifference" Speech by Elie Wiesel, Washington, D.C., Transcript (as delivered), Audio, Video, April 12, 1999.
 "Perils of Indifference" Speech by Elie Wiesel, Washington, D.C., Text and Audio, April 12, 1999. 
 The Kennedy Center Presents: Speak Truth to Power: Elie Wiesel, PBS, October 8, 2000.
 An Evening with Elie Wiesel. Herman P. and Sophia Taubman Endowed Symposia in Jewish Studies. UCTV (University of California). August 19, 2002
 Elie Wiesel: First Person Singular, PBS, October 24, 2002.
 .
 Voices on Antisemitism Interview with Elie Wiesel from the United States Holocaust Memorial Museum, May 24, 2007.

Further reading

 Berenbaum, Michael. The Vision of the Void: Theological Reflections on the Works of Elie Wiesel. Middletown, CT: Wesleyan University Press, 1979. 
 
 
 Davis, Colin. Elie Wiesel's Secretive Texts. Gainesville, FL: University Press of Florida, 1994. 
 
 Downing, Frederick L. Elie Wiesel: A Religious Biography. Macon, GA: Mercer University Press, 2008. 
 Fine, Ellen S. Legacy of Night: The Literary Universe of Elie Wiesel. New York: State University of New York Press, 1982. 
 Fonseca, Isabel. Bury Me Standing: The Gypsies and Their Journey. London: Vintage, 1996. 
 
 Rota, Olivier. Choisir le français pour exprimer l'indicible. Re-published in Sens, dec. 2007, pp. 659–668.

External links

 The Elie Wiesel Foundation for Humanity
 
 
 Biography on The Elie Wiesel Foundation For Humanity
 
 
 
 
 
 
 
 "Free At Last: Elie Wiesel, Plainclothes Nuns, and Breakthroughs – Or Witnessing a Witness of History", pp. 19–21 in 'Spirit of America, Vol. 39: Simple Gifts', La Crosse, WI: DigiCOPY, 2017, Essay by David Joseph Marcou about his meeting Mr. Wiesel and being official Viterbo U. Photographer for Elie Wiesel Day at Viterbo U., 9-26-06, in Book by DJ Marcou on Missouri J-School Library Web-page of David Joseph Marcou's works 
 Elie Wiesel, Nobel Luminaries - Jewish Nobel Prize Winners, on the Beit Hatfutsot-The Museum of the Jewish People Website.

1928 births
2016 deaths
Nobel Peace Prize laureates
American Nobel laureates
Romanian Nobel laureates
Jewish American novelists
20th-century American novelists
21st-century American novelists
20th-century translators
21st-century translators
American activists
American agnostics
American Federation of Teachers people
American Jewish theologians
American male novelists
American memoirists
American people of Hungarian-Jewish descent
American people of Romanian-Jewish descent
American religious writers
Auschwitz concentration camp survivors
American biblical scholars
Columbia University faculty
Boston University faculty
Buchenwald concentration camp survivors
Congressional Gold Medal recipients
Hasidic Judaism
Holocaust historiography
Honorary Knights Commander of the Order of the British Empire
Hungarian Jews
Hungarian writers
Jewish agnostics
Jewish concentration camp survivors
Knights Commander of the Order of Merit of the Federal Republic of Germany
Madoff investment scandal
Members of the American Academy of Arts and Letters
National Humanities Medal recipients
Nazi-era ghetto inmates
Novelists from Massachusetts
People from Sighetu Marmației
Presidential Medal of Freedom recipients
Prix Médicis winners
Prix du Livre Inter winners
Recipients of the Presidential Medal of Distinction of Israel
Romanian agnostics
Romanian emigrants to the United States
Romanian Jews
Romanian writers
The Holocaust in Hungary
Translators to Yiddish
United Nations Messengers of Peace
University of Paris alumni
Victims of human rights abuses
Writers on antisemitism
Yiddish-language writers
21st-century American non-fiction writers
American male non-fiction writers
Recipients of the Four Freedoms Award
Burials at Kensico Cemetery
Grand Officers of the Order of the Star of Romania
20th-century American male writers
21st-century American male writers